Edgar Lewis Horwood (1868–1957) was a Canadian architect who served as Chief Dominion Architect from 1915 to 1917.

As chief government architect he was responsible for many of the federal buildings constructed in this period. Drawings for public buildings designed by Horwood and his staff during his tenure as Chief Architect of the Department of Public Works are held at the National Archives of Canada in Ottawa.

He worked as an architect in private practice in Ottawa and the National Capital Region as E.L. Horwood (1895–1912); Horwood & Taylor (1907–10); Horwood, Taylor & Horwood (1911–1912); E.L. Horwood (1918–1929);  Horwood & Horwood (1929–1937).

In 1891, Edgar Lewis Horwood designed the Britannia Nautical Club’s first clubhouse; the Club is celebrating is 125th anniversary in 2012.

Works as Dominion Architect

As Dominion Architect, his most important building was the Dominion Astrophysical Observatory and residence, Victoria, British Columbia, West Saanich Road (1915–16), which is a National Historic Site of Canada.

Other buildings he designed include a drill hall in Calgary, Alberta in 1916–17, two buildings at the Central Experimental Farm in Ottawa, Ontario: the Cereal and Agrostology Building, (1915–16) and the Agricultural Building (1915). He also designed buildings for an Experimental Farm in Brandon, Manitoba. These included a utility building  (1917); two large barns (1917). Other designs include an addition to the Royal Canadian Mint refinery on Sussex Drive (1916) and a number of post offices across Canada: Summerside, Prince Edward Island (1915); Hampton, New Brunswick (1914–15); Chester, Nova Scotia (1915); Almonte, Ontario (1914–15); Burford, Ontario, King Street (1914–15); Fort Frances, Ontario (1916); Milverton, Ontario (1914–15); Palmerston, Ontario, William Street at Bell Street, (1915); Shawville, Quebec (1915–16)

Works in private practice

Trinity Methodist Church, 1896 Wellington, Ontario
Ottawa City Hall, Elgin Street, addition and alterations, 1899; burned 1931
Canadian Conservatory of Music, Bay Street at Slater Street, 1902
Ottawa Citizen Building, Sparks Street, 1902–03
Ottawa Public Library, Metcalfe Street at Laurier Avenue, 1903–05
Manotick, Ontario Methodist Church, 1904
Masonic Temple, Bank Street at Wellington Street, 1907
Ottawa Collegiate Institute, Lisgar Street near Elgin Street, addition of West Wing, 1907
Carp, Ontario, Methodist Church, 1912
Pembroke, Ontario Holy Trinity Anglican Church, Renfrew Street, 1925
Gatineau, Québec  Château Monsarrat, AKA Stoneleigh, 100, rue du Château, 1930
Central Experimental Farm, Carling Avenue, records storage building, 1937

External links
Edgar Lewis Horwood, Chief Dominion Architect 
Canada`s Historic Places
Canada`s Historic Places

References

1868 births
1957 deaths
Canadian architects